Ophiostoma breviusculum is a species of fungus in the family Ophiostomataceae, associated with bark beetles infesting larch in Japan. It belongs in the Ophiostoma piceae complex. It was also found in insect galleries of Larix kaempferi. The length of its perithecial necks and synnemata are shorter than in O. piceae. The synnemata also differ from the latter morphologically.

References

Further reading
Yamaoka, Yuichi, et al. "Constant association of ophiostomatoid fungi with the bark beetle Ips subelongatus invading Japanese larch logs." Mycoscience 50.3 (2009): 165–172.
Paciura, Dina, et al. "Characterisation of synnematous bark beetle-associated fungi from China, including Graphium carbonarium sp. nov." Fungal Diversity40.1 (2010): 75–88.
Grobbelaar, Joha W., et al. "Discovery of Ophiostoma tsotsi on Eucalyptus wood chips in China." Mycoscience 52.2 (2011): 111–118.

External links

MycoBank

Fungi described in 2006
Fungal tree pathogens and diseases
Ophiostomatales